Hsu Wen-hsin (born 13 April 1988) is a Taiwanese former tennis player.

Hsu won two singles titles and six doubles titles on the ITF Women's Circuit. On 15 May 2006, she reached her best singles ranking of world No. 221. On 7 May 2012, she peaked at No. 180 in the WTA doubles rankings.

Hsu won her first $50,000 ITF tournament at the 2011 Kōfu International Open, partnering with Chan Chin-wei to defeat Remi Tezuka and Akiko Yonemura in the final.

Playing for Taiwan in the Fed Cup, Hsu reached a win–loss record of 5–1.

ITF finals

Singles (2–6)

Doubles (6–8)

References

External links
 
 
 

1988 births
Living people
Sportspeople from Taipei
Taiwanese female tennis players
Tennis players at the 2010 Asian Games
Asian Games competitors for Chinese Taipei
21st-century Taiwanese women